Dimitrakopoulos is a surname. Notable people with the surname include:

 Athanasios Dimitrakopoulos (1936–2022), Greek politician
 Arkadios Dimitrakopoulos (1824–1908), Greek merchant
 Christos Dimitrakopoulos (born 1974), Greek volleyball player
 Giorgos Dimitrakopoulos (born 1952), Greek politician
 Roussos Dimitrakopoulos, Canadian geoscientist

Greek-language surnames